The Bharathiya Karma Sena (BKS) is a regional political party in the state of Kerala, India. The mass base of the party predominantly consists of Vishwakarma community from Thiruvananthapuram and Kottayam districts of Kerala. Bharathiya Karma Sena (BKS) is a registered-unrecognized political party in Kerala. It was formed on 1 May 2016 .

2016 Assembly Election 
Bharathiya Karma Sena (BKS) Alliance with National Democratic Alliance on 6 May 2016.This was Announced by C. Murugappan Achary. After Discussions with BJP State President Kummanam Rajasekharan. Bharathiya Karma Sena (BKS)  supports all NDA candidate in 2016 Kerala Legislative Assembly election.

References

Political parties in Kerala
Political parties established in 2016
2016  establishments in Kerala